Walker is an unincorporated community in the town of Cranmoor, Wood County, Wisconsin, United States.

Walker was named in honor of a railroad agent.

Notes

Unincorporated communities in Wood County, Wisconsin
Unincorporated communities in Wisconsin